In mathematics, the q-theta function (or modified Jacobi theta function) is a type of q-series which is used to define elliptic hypergeometric series.
 It is given by

where one takes 0 ≤ |q| < 1.  It obeys the identities

It may also be expressed as:

where  is the q-Pochhammer symbol.

See also
 elliptic hypergeometric series
 Jacobi theta function
 Ramanujan theta function

References

Q-analogs
Theta functions